José Fernández Serrano (born 1 February 1933) is a Spanish middle-distance runner. He competed in the men's 3000 metres steeplechase at the 1960 Summer Olympics.

References

External links
 

1933 births
Living people
Athletes (track and field) at the 1960 Summer Olympics
Spanish male middle-distance runners
Spanish male steeplechase runners
Olympic athletes of Spain
Place of birth missing (living people)
20th-century Spanish people
21st-century Spanish people